Vilhjalmur Stefansson (November 3, 1879 – August 26, 1962) was an Arctic explorer and ethnologist.  He was born in Manitoba, Canada.

Early life
Stefansson, born William Stephenson, was born at Arnes, Manitoba, Canada, in 1879. His parents had emigrated from Iceland to Manitoba two years earlier. After losing two children during a period of devastating flooding, the family moved to Dakota Territory in 1880 and homesteaded a mile southwest of the village of Mountain in Thingvalla Township of Pembina County.

He was educated at the universities of North Dakota and of Iowa (A.B., 1903). During his college years, in 1899, he changed his name, for unknown reasons, to Vilhjalmur Stefansson. He studied anthropology at the graduate school of Harvard University, where for two years he was an instructor.

Early explorations
In 1904 and 1905, Stefansson did archaeological research in Iceland. Recruited by Ejnar Mikkelsen and Ernest de Koven Leffingwell for their Anglo-American Polar Expedition, he lived with the Inuit of the Mackenzie River Delta during the winter of 1906–1907, returning alone across country via the Porcupine and Yukon rivers. 

Under the auspices of the American Museum of Natural History in New York City, he and Dr. Rudolph Martin Anderson undertook the ethnological survey of the central Arctic coasts of the shores of North America from 1908 to 1912.

In 1908, Stefansson made a decision that would affect the rest of his time in Alaska: he hired Natkusiak, an Inuk guide, who would remain with him as his primary guide for the rest of his Alaska expeditions. At the time he met Natkusiak, the Inuk guide was working for Capt. George B. Leavitt, a Massachusetts whaling ship captain and friend of Stefansson's who sometimes brought him replenishments of supplies from the American Museum of Natural History.

Christian Klengenberg is first credited to have introduced the term "Blonde Eskimo" to Stefansson just before Stefansson's visit to the Inuit inhabiting southwestern Victoria Island, Canada, in 1910. Stefansson, though, preferred the term “Copper Inuit“ (although there was already a group of people known by that name) . Adolphus Greely in 1912 first compiled the sightings recorded in earlier literature of fair-haired Arctic natives and in 1912 published them in the National Geographic Magazine entitled "The Origin of Stefansson's Blonde Eskimo". Newspapers subsequently popularised the term "Blonde Eskimo", which caught more readers' attention despite Stefansson's preference for “Copper Inuit”. Stefansson later referenced Greely's work in his writings and the term "Blonde Eskimo" became applied to sightings of fair-haired Inuit from as early as the 17th century.

Loss of the Karluk and rescue of survivors

Stefansson organized and directed the Canadian Arctic Expedition, 1913–1916 to explore the regions west of Parry Archipelago for the Government of Canada. Three ships, the Karluk, the Mary Sachs, and the Alaska were employed.

Stefansson left the main ship, the Karluk, when it became marooned in the ice in August/September 1913. Stefansson's explanation was that he and five other expedition members left to go hunting to provide fresh meat for the crew. However, William Laird McKinley and others who were left on the ship suspected Stefansson left deliberately, anticipating that the ship would be carried off by moving ice, as indeed happened. The ship, with Captain Robert Bartlett of Newfoundland and 24 other expedition members aboard, drifted westward with the ice and was eventually crushed. It sank on January 11, 1914. Four of the survivors made their way to Herald Island but eventually died there, possibly from carbon monoxide poisoning, before they could be rescued. Four others, including Alistair Mackay who had been part of the Nimrod Expedition (British Antarctic Expedition, 1907–09), led by Sir Ernest Shackleton, tried reaching Wrangel Island on their own but perished. The remaining members of the expedition, under command of Captain Bartlett, made their way to Wrangel Island where three of them died. Bartlett and the Inuk hunter Kataktovik made their way across sea ice to Siberia to get help. The remaining survivors were picked up by the King & Winge, an American fishing schooner and the USRC Bear, a cutter of the United States Revenue Cutter Service in September 1914.

Stefansson resumed his explorations by sledge over the Arctic Ocean (known locally as the Beaufort Sea), leaving Collinson Point, Alaska in April 1914. Stefansson continued exploring until 1918.

Wrangel Island fiasco
In 1921, he encouraged and planned an expedition for four young men to colonise Wrangel Island north of Siberia, where the eleven survivors of the 22 men on the Karluk had lived from March to September 1914. Stefansson had designs for forming an exploration company that would be geared towards individuals interested in touring the Arctic island.

Stefansson originally wanted to claim Wrangel Island for the Canadian government. However, due to the dangerous outcome of his initial trip to the island, the government refused to assist with the expedition. He then wanted to claim the land for Britain but the British government rejected the claim when it was made by the young men of the expedition. The raising of the British flag on Wrangel Island, an acknowledged Russian territory, caused an international incident.

The four young men Stefansson recruited, Americans, Frederick Maurer, E. Lorne Knight, and Milton Galle, and Canadian Allan Crawford, were inadequately experienced and ill-equipped for the expedition. All perished on the island or in an attempt to get help from Siberia across the frozen Chukchi Sea. The only survivors were Ada Blackjack, an Iñupiat woman the men had hired in Nome, Alaska as a seamstress and taken with them as a cook, and the expedition's cat, Vic. Ada Blackjack had taught herself survival skills and cared for the last man on the island, E. Lorne Knight, until he died of scurvy. Blackjack was not rescued until 1923, having spent a total of two years on Wrangel Island. Stefansson drew the ire of the public and the families of the men who perished for having sent such ill-equipped young explorers to Wrangel. His reputation was severely tainted by this disaster, along with that of the Karluk.

Discoveries
Stefansson produced the first written records of several places, such as Brock, Mackenzie King, Borden, Meighen, and Lougheed Islands and the edge of the continental shelf. He extended the works of Francis Leopold McClintock. From April 1914 to June 1915 he lived on the ice pack. Stefansson continued his explorations leaving from Herschel Island on August 23, 1915.

On January 30, 1920, The Pioche Record reported that Stefansson discovered a lost cache from the 1853 McClintock expedition on Melville Island. Clothing and food from the cache was in excellent condition despite the harsh Arctic conditions.

In 1921, he was awarded the Founder's Medal of the Royal Geographical Society for his explorations of the Arctic.

Later career
Stefansson remained a well-known explorer for the rest of his life. Late in life, through his affiliation with Dartmouth College (he was Director of Polar Studies), he became a major figure in the establishment of the United States Army's Cold Regions Research and Engineering Laboratory (CRREL) in Hanover, New Hampshire. CRREL-supported research, often conducted in winter on the forbidding summit of Mount Washington, was key to developing matériel and doctrine to support alpine conflict.

Stefansson joined the Explorers Club in 1908, four years after its founding. He later served as Club President twice: 1919–1922 and 1937–1939. In the all-male Club, the Board drew attention under Stefansson's reign when it put forth an amendment to its by-laws in 1938 that read: "A Woman's Roll of Honor shall be instituted to which the Board of Directors may name women of the United States and Canada in recognition of the noteworthy achievements and writings in the field of the Club's interests, primarily exploration." Perhaps to comfort fellow members, the article added, "This Woman's Roll of Honor shall be quite outside the Club's organisation but shall correspond in dignity to the Honorary Class of (male) members within it." His continued support of women in anthropology is demonstrated in his 1939–1941 mentorship of Gitel Steed as she undertook research on diet and subsistence for his two-volume Lives of the Hunters, from which she began a dissertation on the topic of hunter-gatherer.

While living in New York City, Stefansson was one of the regulars at Romany Marie's Greenwich Village cafés During the years when he and novelist Fannie Hurst were having an affair, they met there when he was in town. In 1940, at the age of 62, he met 28-year-old Evelyn Schwartz at Romany Marie's; she became his secretary and they married soon after.

In 1941, he became the third honorary member of the American Polar Society. He served as president of the History of Science Society from 1945–46.

Legacy
Stefansson's personal papers and collection of Arctic artifacts are maintained and available to the public at the Dartmouth College Library.

Stefansson is frequently quoted as saying that "An adventure is a sign of incompetence..."

Roald Amundsen stated he was "the greatest humbug alive" referring to his mismanagement of the Wrangel Island fiascos.

On May 28, 1986, the United States Postal Service issued a 22 cent postage stamp in his honour.

Political affiliations
In the 1930s, pro-Soviet movements were created in the US that aimed primarily to provide support for the Soviet project to establish a Jewish socialist republic in the Birobidzhan region in the far east of the Soviet Union. One of the organizations prominent in this campaign was the American Committee for the Settlement of Jews in Birobidjan (or Ambijan) formed in 1934. A tireless proponent of settlement in Birobidzhan, Stefansson appeared at countless Ambijan meetings, dinners, and rallies, and proved an invaluable resource for the group. Ambijan produced a 50-page Year Book at the end of 1936, full of testimonials and letters of support. Among these was one from Stefansson, who was now also listed as a member of Ambijan's Board of Directors and Governors: "The Birobidjan project seems to me to offer a most statesmanlike contribution to the problem of the rehabilitation of eastern and central European Jewry," he wrote.

Ambijan's national conference in New York on November 25–26, 1944 pledged to raise $1 million to support refugees in Stalingrad and Birobidzhan. Prominent guests and speakers included New York Representative Emanuel Celler, Senator Elbert D. Thomas of Utah, and Soviet Ambassador Andrei Gromyko. A public dinner, attended by the delegates and their guests, was hosted by Vilhjalmur and his wife, Evelyn Stefansson. Vilhjalmur was selected as one of two vice-presidents of the organization.

However, with the growing anti-Soviet feeling in the country after World War II, "exposés" of Stefansson began to appear in the press. In August 1951, he was denounced as a communist before a Senate Internal Security subcommittee by Louis F. Budenz, a Communist-turned-Catholic. Stefansson himself may have by then had some second thoughts about Ambijan since his posthumously published autobiography conspicuously made no mention of his work on its behalf. The same is true of his otherwise very-complete obituary in The New York Times of August 27, 1962.

Advocacy of exclusively meat  diet

Stefansson is also a figure of considerable interest in dietary circles, especially those with an interest in a very low-carbohydrate diet. Stefansson documented the fact that the Inuit diet was then consisted about 90% meat and fish. Inuit would often go six to nine months a year eating nothing but fatty meat and fresh fish, which might currently be perceived as a 'zero carb' / no-carbohydrate diet. (The diet technically contains a very low amount of carbohydates, as the fresh fish that the Inuit ate would have had a small amount of glycogen.) Stefansson found that he and his fellow explorers of European, Black, and South Sea Islands descent were also “perfectly healthy” on such a diet. 

Some years after his first experience with the Inuit (known as Eskimos in Stefansson's time), Stefansson returned to the Arctic with a colleague, Dr. Karsten Anderson, to carry out research for the American Museum of Natural History. They were supplied with every necessity, including a year's supply of 'civilised' food. They declined, electing instead to live off the land. In the end, the one-year project stretched to four years, during which time the two men ate only the meat they could kill and the fish they could catch in the Canadian Arctic. Neither of the two men suffered any adverse after-effects from their four-year experiment. Stefansson deduced, as had William Banting, that the body could function, remain healthy, vigorous, and slender if a diet in which as much food was eaten as the body required, with only carbohydrates restricted and the total number of calories ignored.

While there was considerable skepticism when Stefansson reported his findings about the viability of an exclusively meat diet, his claims have been borne out in later studies and analyses. In multiple studies, it was shown that the Inuit diet was a unique ketogenic diet. While the Inuit diet derived a percentage of its calories from the glycogen found in the raw meats, the native Inuit ate a diet of primarily stewed (boiled) fresh fish and fatty meats such as caribou, whale, or seal, while occasionally eating raw fish. 

To combat erroneous conventional beliefs about diet, Stefansson and his fellow explorer Karsten Anderson agreed to undertake an official study to demonstrate that they could eat a 100% meat diet in a closely observed laboratory setting for the first several weeks.  For the rest of an entire year, paid observers followed them to ensure dietary compliance. The book The Unseen Power: Public Relations states that Pendelton Dudley, once considered the "dean of public relations", convinced the American Meat Institute to fund this study. The results were published.  

Anderson had developed glycosuria during this time, which is normally associated with untreated diabetes. But unlike the pathology of diabetes, in this particular study, glycosuria was present in Anderson for four days and coincided only with  the administration of a 100 gm of glucose for a tolerance test, and with the first three days of his pneumonia, where he received fluids and a diet rich in carbohydrate. Once that situation resolved, the glucosuria disappeared.

At the researchers' request, Stefansson was asked to eat lean meat only for a time. Stefansson noted that in the Arctic, very lean meat sometimes produced "digestive disturbances".  His prior experience was that lean meat would lead to illness after the second or third fatless week. Stefansson developed nausea and diarrhea on the third day at Bellevue. Stefansson attributes the fast onset of illness due to the lean meat that he was served versus the fattier caribou meat he consumed previously.  After eating fatty meat, he fully recovered in two days.  However, the initial disturbance was followed by "a period of persistent constipation lasting 10 days".

There were no deficiency problems while eating only the kind of fatty meat they requested. The two men remained healthy; their bowels remained normal, except that their stools were smaller and did not smell. Stefansson's gingivitis disappeared by the end of the experiment although there was an increase in the deposit of tartar on his teeth.  During this experiment his intake had varied between 2,000 and 3,100 calories per day and he derived an average of almost 80% of his energy from animal fat and almost 20% from animal protein.  Daily intake varied from 100-140 grams of protein, 200-300 grams of fat, and 7-12 grams of carbohydrates.

References

Literature

 Stefansson, Vilhjalmur. My Life with the Eskimo; The Macmillan Company, New York, 1912.
 Stefansson, Vilhjalmur. Stefánsson-Anderson Expedition, 1909–12; Anthropological Papers, AMNH, vol. XIV., New York, 1914.
 Stefansson, Vilhjalmur.  The Friendly Arctic; The Macmillan Company, New York, 1921.
 Stefansson, Vilhjalmur. The Standardization of Error; W. W. Norton & Company, Inc., New York, 1927.
 Stefansson, Vilhjalmur. Unsolved Mysteries of the Arctic; The Macmillan Company, New York, 1938.
 Stefansson, Vilhjalmur. Not by Bread Alone; The Macmillan Company, New York, 1946.
 Stefansson, Vilhjalmur. The Fat of the Land; The Macmillan Company, New York, 1956.
 Stefansson, Vilhjalmur. Discovery – the autobiography of Vilhjalmur Stefansson; McGraw-Hill Book Company, New York, 1964.
 Stefansson, Vilhjalmur. Cancer: Disease of civilization? An anthropological and historical study; Hill and Wang, Inc., New York, 1960.
 Stefansson, Vilhjalmur (ed.). Great Adventures and Explorations; The Dial Press, 1947.
 Diubaldo, Richard. Stefansson and the Canadian Arctic; McGill-Queen's University Press, Montreal, 1978.
 Stefansson, Vilhjalmur.  Lessons in living from the Stone Age. 
 Hunt, William R. Stef: A Biography of Vilhjalmur Stefansson, Canadian Arctic explorer; University of British Columbia Press, Vancouver, 1986. 
 Jenness, Stuart Edward. The Making of an Explorer: George Hubert Wilkins and the Canadian Arctic Expedition, 1913–1916; McGill-Queen's Press – MQUP, 2004. 
 Niven, Jennifer. The Ice Master: The Doomed 1913 Voyage of the Karluk, Hyperion Books, 2000.
 Niven, Jennifer. Ada Blackjack: A True Story Of Survival In The Arctic, Hyperion Books, 2003. 
 Pálsson, Gísli. Writing on Ice: The Ethnographic Notebooks of Vilhjalmur Stefansson; Dartmouth College Press, University Press of New England, Hanover, 2001. 
 Pálsson, Gísli. "The legacy of Vilhjalmur Stefansson", the Stefansson Arctic Institute (and individual authors), 2000.

Further reading

External links

 
 
"Adventures in Diet", Harper's Monthly magazine, November 1935
Biography of Vilhjalmur Stefansson
Stefansson on enchantedlearning.com
"Arctic Dreamer" Award-winning documentary on Stefansson's life, includes much archival footage

1879 births
1962 deaths
American Polar Society honorary members
Canadian explorers
Canadian people of Icelandic descent
Canadian Unitarians
Chukchi Sea
Dartmouth College faculty
Explorers of Canada
Explorers of the Arctic
Harvard University alumni
History of the Inuvialuit Settlement Region
Low-carbohydrate diet advocates
People from Gimli, Manitoba
Persons of National Historic Significance (Canada)
Royal Canadian Geographical Society fellows
University of North Dakota alumni
University of Iowa alumni